is one of syllable in Javanese script that represent the sound /ɾɔ/, /ɾa/. It is transliterated to Latin as "ra", and sometimes in Indonesian orthography as "ro".

Pasangan 
Its pasangan form , is located on the bottom side of the previous syllable. The pasangan only occurs if a word is ended with a consonant, and the next word starts with 'r', for example  - anak raja (king's child). If it is located between a consonant and a vocal, it didn't form a pasangan, instead it uses a special panjingan called a cakra or cakra keret, for example  - griya (house).

Murda 
The letter  doesn't have a murda form.

Final consonant 
 cannot became final consonant (e.g. ). It is replaced by layar. For example:  - layar (sail), not

Honorific form 

Glyphs

Unicode block 

Javanese script was added to the Unicode Standard in October, 2009 with the release of version 5.2.

References 

Javanese script